Lieutenant-General Sir Alfred Henry Keogh,  (3 July 1857 – 30 July 1936) was a medical doctor in the British Army. He served as Director-General Army Medical Services twice; from 1905 to 1910 and 1914 to 1918.

Early life
Keogh was born in Dublin on 3 July 1857 to Henry Keogh, a barrister and magistrate of Roscommon. He was educated at Queen's College, Galway, and Guy's Hospital, London. He received his Doctor of Medicine (MD) degree from the Queen's University of Ireland in 1878.

Upon graduation he moved to London to undertake his house officer placements. He served as a house physician at the Brompton Hospital for Diseases of the Chest, and as a clinical assistant at the Royal Westminster Ophthalmic Hospital.

Military career
On 2 March 1880, Keogh was commissioned into the Army Medical Services as a surgeon-captain. His first posting was as a surgeon to the Royal Arsenal, Woolwich. On 6 March 1892, he was promoted to surgeon-major. With the outbreak of the Second Boer War in 1899, he was posted to South Africa. He was promoted to lieutenant-colonel on 6 March 1900, and became commander of No. 3 General Hospital near Cape Town. During the war, he served in Cape Colony, the Orange Free State, and the Transvaal Republic.

In January 1902, following his return from the Second Boer War, he was appointed Deputy Director-General of the Army Medical Services. He was promoted to colonel on 2 December 1904. On 1 January 1905, he was appointed Director-General Army Medical Services and promoted to lieutenant-general. He retired from the military on 6 March 1910.

With the outbreak of the First World War, he was reappointed DGAMS on 3 October 1914. He supervised the huge expansion of the Army’s medical services to cope with the war, and was in command of the medical services in the UK. He left the appointment and the military in June 1918.

Later life
He was appointed Rector of Imperial College London and served from 1910 to 1922.

He died at 10 Warwick Square, London, on 30 July 1936. A requiem mass was held at Westminster Cathedral. He was buried in the Marylebone Cemetery, Finchley.

Honours and decorations

On 29 November 1900, he was appointed Companion of the Order of the Bath (CB) in recognition of services in the campaign in South Africa, 1899 to 1900. On 7 May 1903, he was appointed a Knight of Grace of the Venerable Order of Saint John (KStJ). He was promoted to Knight Commander of the Order of the Bath in the 1906 King's Birthday Honours. On 24 July 1907, he was appointed Honorary Physician to the King (KHP). He was promoted to Knight Grand Cross of the Order of the Bath (GCB) on 24 January 1917 'for services rendered in connection with [WWI]'. He was appointed to the Order of the Companions of Honour (CH) on 25 February 1918 'for services in connection with the war'. In the 1918 King's Birthday Honours, he was appointed Knight Grand Cross of the Royal Victorian Order (GCVO).

He was a recipient of a number of foreign honours. In 1917, he was appointed Grand Officer of the Order of the Crown by the King of the Belgians, and Grand Officer of the Legion of Honour by the President of France. In 1918, he was awarded the Order of the White Eagle, 2nd Class by the King of Serbia.

He received the Queen's South Africa Medal with four clasps in 1901.

Legacy
The Keogh Platoon is named in honour of Sir Alfred Keogh, who is enshrined in the history of the Royal Army Medical Corps (RAMC).
The Keogh Barracks at Mytchett, Surrey, was also named in Sir Alfred Keogh's memory.
Keogh Hall, a hall of residence at Imperial College London is named in his honour.

References

External links

Military background of Sir Alfred Keogh

1857 births
1936 deaths
Medical doctors from Dublin (city)
Alumni of the University of Galway
Alumni of Queen's University Belfast
Fellows of the Royal College of Surgeons
Irish surgeons
20th-century Irish medical doctors
Royal Army Medical Corps officers
Knights Grand Cross of the Order of the Bath
Knights Grand Cross of the Royal Victorian Order
Rectors of Imperial College London
Members of the Order of the Companions of Honour
Knights of Grace of the Order of St John
Grand Officers of the Order of the Crown (Belgium)
Grand Officiers of the Légion d'honneur
20th-century surgeons